Frabrishous and Sarah A. Thomas House is a historic home located at Salisbury, Chariton County, Missouri. It was built in 1873, and is a two-story, Italianate style frame dwelling.  It sits on a brick and concrete block foundation.  It has a -story rear addition and two-story cross-gable wing.

It was listed on the National Register of Historic Places in 1999.

References

Houses on the National Register of Historic Places in Missouri
Italianate architecture in Missouri
Houses completed in 1873
Buildings and structures in Chariton County, Missouri
National Register of Historic Places in Chariton County, Missouri